Pedro Celis (born in Monterrey, Nuevo León, México) is a retired Distinguished Engineer from Microsoft Corporation.

He served at the U.S. President's
Information Technology Advisory Committee (PITAC) from 2003 to 2005.
PITAC advises the president on policies and investments that the federal government should pursue to enhance and maintain the preeminence of the U.S. in information technology.

He holds over 15 US patents.

In 2009 the Hispanic Business Magazine named him one of the 100 most influential Hispanics in the United States.

In February 2014, he announced a bid for U.S. Congress in Washington state's 1st Congressional District to challenge incumbent U.S. Rep. Suzan DelBene. In August 2014, Celis narrowly advanced through the primary election before falling to DelBene in the November general.

Education and career
Celis graduated in 1979 with a bachelor's degree in Computer Engineering from the Monterrey Institute of Technology and Higher Studies (ITESM) and received both a master's degree in Mathematics (1982) and a doctorate in Computer Science (1986) from the University of Waterloo.

He worked as an assistant professor at the Computer Science Department of Indiana University. He later worked as a software designer at Britton Lee, Inc. He worked at Tandem Computers from 1989 to 1998 where he became Technical Director of the NonStop SQL team.

At Microsoft from 1998 to 2012, Celis held several positions in the SQL Server group, including leading the WinFS team at its creation and Chief Technology Officer (CTO) for SQL Server. He worked in the Bing organization from 2009 to 2011. He was considered a senior technical leader in the company.

The Hispanic IT Executive Council named Celis as one of the most influential Hispanics in the IT industry in 2009
and 2010.

Other activities
Celis is an organizer, founder and member of the board of directors  of Plaza Bank, a Latino business focused bank that opened in 2006  in Seattle, Washington.

He is a board member of Stronger Families and the Washington News Council.
He has climbed Mount Rainier to benefit the Fred Hutchinson Cancer Research Center's ''Climb to Fight Breast Cancer.

He is the founder of  the Washington State chapter of the Republican National Hispanic Assembly and served as its first chairman from 2001 to 2005. From 2005 to 2007 he served as National Chairman of the RNHA.

In the 2008 presidential primary campaign, Celis served as Co-Chair of the Mitt Romney for President Washington Steering Committee.

References

External links
Official campaign website of Pedro Celis for Congress
Microsoft PressPass page on Pedro Celis
Commercial racial profiling: Mexican truckers singled out, Seattle Times,  Aug. 27, 2004
Es Mexicano la base de SQL en Microsoft, El Norte, Sept. 13, 2004 (in Spanish)
El gurú cibernético de Bush, El Universal, Apr. 29, 2005 (in Spanish)
Social Security: A Tale of Two Problems, Washington Policy Center, 2005

Living people
21st-century American engineers
Mexican engineers
Microsoft employees
Database researchers
Monterrey Institute of Technology and Higher Education alumni
University of Waterloo alumni
Indiana University faculty
Mexican emigrants to the United States
Washington (state) Republicans
Politicians from Monterrey
Year of birth missing (living people)